The Frecuencia Latina bombing was a terrorist attack in Lima, Peru on June 5 1992. It was perpetrated by the terrorist organization Shining Path, which detonated a truck bomb at the primary headquarters of television channel Frecuencia 2 (currently denominated Latina Televisión) in Lima's district of Jesús María. The truck was brought to the aforementioned television station and was detonated. The facilities of the television station were destroyed and had to be reconstructed. The bomb also destroyed several nearby vehicles and a school of architecture across the street from the station.

The attack injured over 20 people, and killed television producer Alejandro Pérez and guards Javier Requis and Teddy Hidalgo.

References

1990s in Lima
1992 murders in Peru
car and truck bombings in South America
communist terrorism
June 1992 events in South America
Shining Path
terrorist incidents in Peru in the 1990s
terrorist incidents in South America in 1992
History of Lima